Don't Go is a 2010 Turkish animated short film written and directed by Turgut Akaçık, and produced by Anima Studios Istanbul. The film won the Special Distinction ex æquo and Junior Jury Award for a short film at the 2010 Annecy International Animated Film Festival.

Music 
The music used in the animated short film Don't Go is titled Invisible and was produced by Fischerspooner.

References

External links
 Teaser on Vimeo

Turkish animated films
Turkish short films
Turkish animated short films
Films with live action and animation
2010s animated short films